Kim Ki-nam or similar may refer to:

 Kim Ki-nam (politician): North Korean politician
 Kim Ki-nam (footballer, born 1971): South Korean footballer who played for Pohang Steelers, Anyang LG Cheetahs, Bucheon SK
 Kim Ki-nam (footballer, born 1973): South Korean footballer who played for Ulsan Hyundai FC
 Kim Ki-nam (actor): South Korean actor